Qarah Kandi (also Romanized as Qarah Kandī and Qareh Kandī) is a village in Qarah Zia od Din Rural District of the Central District of Chaypareh County, West Azerbaijan province, Iran. At the 2006 National Census, its population (as a part of the former Chaypareh District of Khoy County) was 1,018 in 242 households. The following census in 2011 counted 1,606 people in 442 households, by which time the district was separated from the county, established as Chaypareh County, and divided into two districts. The latest census in 2016 showed a population of 2,141 people in 581 households; it was the largest village in its rural district.

References 

Chaypareh County

Populated places in West Azerbaijan Province

Populated places in Chaypareh County